The IPT-6 Stratus, was a Brazilian single-seat,  was a high-performance two-seat, high-wing sailplane.

Design and development
Stratus was conceived soon after its predecessor IPT-5 Jaraguá, created by Estonian engineer Johannes Lepper, who himself made the first flight of this sailplane.

Construction
It was built with the fuselage caves were made of guapuruvu and freijó, and the bird ribs were also made of freijó. The outer skin was made of pine plywood from paraná pine. The few metal sheets were chrome-molybdenum steel plates and tubes, 1/8-inch diameter flexible steel cables, and uprights also of chrome-molybdenum steel.

Specifications

See also

 List of Brazilian gliders

References

External links
IPT’s official site

High-wing aircraft
1940s Brazilian sailplanes
Aircraft first flown in 1944
Glider aircraft